Lucerapex is a genus of sea snails, marine gastropod mollusks in the family Turridae, the turrids.

Distribution
This marine genus has a wide Indo-West Pacific distribution. Fossils have been in Quaternary strata on Timor and Indonesia and Miocene strata in South Australia and New Zealand

Species
Species within the genus Lucerapex include:
 Lucerapex adenica Powell, 1964
 Lucerapex carola (Thiele, 1925)
 Lucerapex casearia (Hedley & Petterd, 1906)
 Lucerapex cracens Kantor, Fedosov & Puillandre, 2018
 Lucerapex denticulata (Thiele, 1925)
 Lucerapex indagatoris (Finlay H.J., 1927)
 Lucerapex laevicarinata Kantor, Fedosov & Puillandre, 2018
 † Lucerapex murndaliana (Tenison Woods, 1879)
 † Lucerapex pulcherrimus (Vella, 1954) 
 † Lucerapex raulini (Peyrot, 1931) 
 Lucerapex schepmani Shuto, 1970
Species brought into synonymy
 Lucerapex angustatus (Powell, 1940): synonym of Kuroshioturris angustata (Powell, 1940)
 Lucerapex laevicarinatus Kantor, Fedosov & Puillandre, 2018: synonym of Lucerapex laevicarinata Kantor, Fedosov & Puillandre, 2018 (wrong gender agreement of specific epithet)

References

 Powell, A.W.B. 1966. The molluscan families Speightiidae and Turridae, an evaluation of the valid taxa, both Recent and fossil, with list of characteristic species. Bulletin of the Auckland Institute and Museum. Auckland, New Zealand 5: 1–184, pls 1–23 
 Wilson, B. 1994. Australian marine shells. Prosobranch gastropods. Kallaroo, WA : Odyssey Publishing Vol. 2 370 pp.
 J. J. Sepkoski. 2002. A compendium of fossil marine animal genera. Bulletins of American Paleontology 363:1-560

External links
 A.W.B. Powell, The family Turridae in the Indo-Pacific. Part 1. The subfamily Turrinae; Indo-Pacific mollusca. vol. 1 Pages: 227--346
 Bouchet, P.; Kantor, Y. I.; Sysoev, A.; Puillandre, N. (2011). A new operational classification of the Conoidea (Gastropoda). Journal of Molluscan Studies. 77(3): 273-308
 Abdelkrim J., Aznar-Cormano L., Fedosov A., Kantor Y., Lozouet P., Phuong M., Zaharias P. & Puillandre N. (2018). Exon-capture based phylogeny and diversification of the venomous gastropods (Neogastropoda, Conoidea). Molecular Biology and Evolution. 35(10): 2355-2374
  Tucker, J.K. 2004 Catalog of recent and fossil turrids (Mollusca: Gastropoda). Zootaxa 682:1-1295.
 Worldwide Mollusc Species Data Base: Turridae